Christophe Vicard (born 27 September 1967) is a French sports shooter. He competed at the 1996 Summer Olympics and the 2000 Summer Olympics.

References

External links
 

1967 births
Living people
French male sport shooters
Olympic shooters of France
Shooters at the 1996 Summer Olympics
Shooters at the 2000 Summer Olympics
People from Angoulême
Sportspeople from Charente